Glendale High School is the senior public high school in Tillsonburg, Ontario, Canada, and was founded in 1959.  It is a fully composite school community offering courses for students in grades 9 through 12, along with sports, clubs and special events. Students within its attendance boundaries live in Tillsonburg, Otterville, Straffordville, Springford, Brownsville, and Courtland. Its mascot is the Griffon and its colours are black, gold, white, and green. Its staff consists of 54 classroom teachers supported by a teacher librarian, nurse, special education teachers and guidance counselors. The school shows strong academics with a strong staff across all departments. As of 2011 the school had an enrollment of 876. The school underwent renovations in 2010 and saw the addition of a new west wing which consisted of a new gymnasium and greenhouse, along with new Science, History, Geography, Law, Horticulture, Dance and French classrooms. The school went underway with another renovation in 2012 with the addition of a weight room.

Athletics and clubs

Sports at Glendale include Junior and Senior Girls Volleyball and Basketball, Girls and Boys Hockey, Junior and Senior Badminton, Curling, Junior and Senior boys Volleyball, Junior and Senior Boys Basketball, Football, Golf, Wrestling, Girls and Boys Soccer, Track and Field, Boys Rugby, Swim Team, Cross Country and Curling.

Clubs and activities that students may be a part of are: Students' Council, Athletic Council, Spirit Council, House Council, Key Club, Senior/Intermediate/Stage Bands, Yearbook, Grad Council, Prom Committee, United Nations, Sears One Act Plays, Terry Fox, Art Club, Peer helpers, Crimestoppers, Sound Crew, Chair/Floor Crew, Ushers and Ontario Students Against Impaired Driving (OSAID). Students acquire points toward their school letter for their involvement in the various clubs, sports and activities.

Glendale is known for its academics, community involvement, arts programs, and sports teams, particularly the boys basketball teams who have won numerous OFSAA "AA" championships over the years. The Glendale Rugby Club is gaining a lot of attention in the community and around Thames Valley after a second straight TVRAA "AA" title. The school's football team has grown over the last ten years and has won two championships, and finalists in two back to back bowl games. The school has also very successful hockey team with numerous TVRAA "AA" Champions and past OFSAA "AA" finalists. The school also has a very strong music program winning competitions in Canada and USA.

History
Glendale was founded in 1959 as a high school in Tillsonburg, Ontario. The school underwent renovations and additions to fit the incoming grade 9 students of Annandale High School to make Glendale a grade 9–12 school in 2010.

Notable annual events
Glendale takes pride in its many traditions, which include:
 Spirit day(s)
 Buy outs for Hockey and Football
 Terry Fox assembly
 Christmas assembly
 School trips (national and international)
 Motivational speakers
 Rose assembly
 Summer Slam

Departments
 Business Studies
 Cooperative Education
 English & English as a Second Language
 Family Studies
 French
 Geography
 Guidance and Career Education
 History & Law
 Library
 Mathematics
 Music & Dance & Drama
 Physical Education
 Science
 Special Education
 Social Science and Humanities
 Technological Studies
 Visual Art

Volunteers at the school
Throughout the year, volunteers assist in the library. During the literacy test for Grade 10s, many community members contribute through reading or scribing for students. In sports, community coaches add their time and expertise to that of the Glendale staff. The partnerships created have served the school community well.

See also
List of high schools in Ontario

References

High schools in Oxford County, Ontario
Tillsonburg
Educational institutions established in 1959
1959 establishments in Ontario